William Drake (c. 1747-1795) was a British politician who sat in the House of Commons between 1768 and 1795. 
 
Drake was the son of William Drake of Shardeloes and his wife Elizabeth Raworth, daughter of John Raworth of Basinghall St., London. He was educated at Westminster School from 1759 to 1764 and matriculated at Brasenose College, Oxford on 20 June 1765, aged 17. He then undertook the Grand Tour.

In 1768 he was returned as Member of Parliament for Amersham. He was re-elected in 1774, 1780 1784 and 1790 and shared the seat with his father all that time. He was a prolific speaker with a powerful voice. It was said ”He talked sense, and his speeches were ornate: he was fond of a Latin quotation”.

Drake married firstly Mary Hussey on 17 February 1778 who died six months later, and secondly Rachel Elizabeth  Ives of Norwich on 20 August 1781.

Drake predeceased his father on 18 May 1795 leaving an immense property partly acquired by marriage, and partly by some collateral branches. It was said that had he lived to inherit that of his father, he would have been one of the richest men in the country.

References

1747 births
1795 deaths
People educated at Westminster School, London
Alumni of Brasenose College, Oxford
British MPs 1768–1774
British MPs 1774–1780
British MPs 1780–1784
British MPs 1784–1790
British MPs 1790–1796
Members of the Parliament of Great Britain for English constituencies